Mirror Mirror is the eleventh and final album by British rock band 10cc released in 1995, re-titled I'm Not in Love for the 1996 re-release. The album was their first not to be released on a major UK label, this time working with Japanese label Avex following the poor performance of their previous album ...Meanwhile in UK and its relative success in Japan.

Background and recording
Mirror Mirror again was recorded with just two of 10cc's core band members, Graham Gouldman and Eric Stewart, however the album was more a combination of two solo albums than a conventional 10cc production. Gouldman and Stewart played and produced together only one new track – an acoustic reworking of their 1975 hit, "I'm Not in Love", one of only three songs on the album that bore a Stewart-Gouldman joint songwriting credit. The other two Stewart-Gouldman songs were both taken from the sessions of the previous 10cc album ...Meanwhile. Songs written by Stewart, were recorded in France, while Gouldman's songs were recorded in London. Both Stewart and Gouldman co-produced their songs with Adrian Lee who also performed on most of the album's tracks.

Gouldman admitted the album was "almost like two-halves of an album", largely a result of the fact that he and Stewart began recording in separate countries:

Mirror Mirror included appearances by 10cc's longtime collaborators Rick Fenn on one track and Andrew Gold on two tracks, touring members Steve Pigott and Gary Wallis on one track, and notable guest performances by Paul McCartney on two tracks: "Yvonne's the One" co-written by McCartney and Stewart in February 1985 during the sessions for Paul's Press to Play album, but remade and completed on this album, and "Code of Silence" which also started as a collaboration between McCartney and Stewart. The album also included the new reworked mix of the original recording of "I'm Not in Love" from 1975.

One of Gouldman's songs, "Ready to Go Home", was written after the death of his father, Hyme Gouldman, in 1991. Gouldman later re-recorded the song for his 2000 album, And Another Thing..., when he observed in the liner notes: 

Following the tour to support Mirror Mirror, Stewart announced his departure from 10cc. Gouldman, however, has later continued with his own lineup for 10cc as a touring band.

Release
The album was released in several different variations. The original UK (Avex) and European (ZYX, Germany) release featured 14 tracks. For the US edition five tracks were excluded: "Yvonne's the One", "Margo Wants the Mustard", "Blue Bird", "Now You're Gone" and a 1995 acoustic rendition of "I'm Not in Love", but another song was added - "I'm Not in Love: Rework of Art Mix". The Japanese version of the album features 15 tracks, bringing together all of the songs from European and US editions.

Eric Stewart later included his songs from Mirror Mirror on his 2017 best of compilation Anthology.

Reception

Mirror Mirror charted only in Japan giving the band their highest chart position there, however the new acoustic version of "I'm Not in Love" released as a single charted at #29 giving the band the highest position since "Dreadlock Holiday" in 1978.

Allmusic panned the album, commenting that the claim of "I'm Not in Love" being reworked is dubious, since the track has no noticeable differences from the original recording. They summarized the rest of the album with "songs flashing the group's trademark lyrical wit generally tend toward musical vaporware, while those revealing an occasional glimmer of instrumental creativity go nowhere fast on the songwriting."

Track listing

US edition

Japanese edition

Personnel
10cc
 Eric Stewart — lead and backing vocals, lead guitar, keyboards, percussion
 Graham Gouldman — lead and backing vocals, guitars, bass guitar, percussion, mandolin
 Rick Fenn — lead guitar on "Peace in Our Time"
 Steve Pigott — keyboard, drum programming on "Peace in Our Time"
 Gary Wallis — drums, percussion on "Peace in Our Time"
 Kevin Godley — bass drum, musical box, backing vocals on "I'm Not in Love (Rework of Art Mix)"
 Lol Creme — grand piano, backing vocals on "I'm Not in Love (Rework of Art Mix)"

with
 Adrian Lee — bass, programming, arrangements, keyboard, backing vocals, brass section, percussion, accordion, vibes, acoustic guitar (except "I'm Not in Love" and "Now You're Gone")
 Paul McCartney — rhythm guitar ("Yvonne's the One"), strings, electric piano, frogs, crickets, percussion ("Code of Silence")
 Andrew Gold — lead vocal ("Ready to Go Home"), backing vocals ("Grow Old with Me")
 Ian Thomas — drums on "Ready to Go Home"
 Gary Barnacle — saxophone on "Why Did I Break Your Heart?"
 Peter Thoms — trombone on "Take This Woman"
 Lise Aferiat and Nicola Burton – violin on "The Monkey and the Onion" and "Grow Old with Me"
 Chris Goldscheider – viola on "The Monkey and the Onion" and "Grow Old with Me"
 Patrick Jones – cello on "The Monkey and the Onion" and "Grow Old with Me"
 Andrew Hines – cello on "The Monkey and the Onion"

Weekly charts

References

10cc albums
1995 albums
Albums with cover art by Storm Thorgerson
Albums produced by Graham Gouldman
Albums produced by Eric Stewart